Burham is a Palestinian village in the Ramallah and al-Bireh Governorate located twelve kilometers north of Ramallah. The largest nearby town is Bir Zeit located to the southeast. The average elevation of Burham is 680 meters above sea level. The village was established during the Byzantine Empire rule over Palestine.

Location
Burham is located 9.8 km north of Ramallah. It is bordered by 'Atara  and Bir Zeit to the east, Umm Safa and Jibiya  to the north, Kobar to the west, and Bir Zeit and Kobar  to the south.

History
Sherds from the Roman,   Byzantine and  Mamluk eras have been found here.

Ottoman era
Sherds from the early   Ottoman era have also been found.  Under the name of Dayr Burhan it was listed in the 1538-1539  census.

In 1838 it was noted as a  Muslim  village in the  Bani Zeid administrative region.

In 1863 Victor Guérin noted that it was divided into three parts. He further noted "an ancient rock-cut tomb consisting of a
rough sepulchral chamber containing only one koka, and preceded by a vestibule. Here and there are old foundations built of badly quarried stones. There are also remains, probably of an ancient church."

An official Ottoman village list of about 1870 showed that  it had a total of 14 houses and a population of 69, though the population count included men, only.

In 1882, the PEF's  Survey of Western Palestine (SWP)  described Khurbet Burheim as: "A few houses on high ground." They further noted that it was "A ruined village, with caves. It is still inhabited by a few peasants."

British Mandate era
In the 1922 census of Palestine conducted by the British Mandate authorities, Burham had a population of 74  Muslims,   increasing at the time of the 1931 census to 122, still all Muslim, in 26 houses.

In  the 1945 statistics, the population was 150 Muslims,  while the total land area was 1,589  dunams, according to an official land and population survey. Of this,  191 were for plantations and irrigable land, 787  for cereals, while 6 dunams were classified as built-up areas.

Jordanian era
In the wake of the 1948 Arab–Israeli War, and after the 1949 Armistice Agreements, Burham  came  under Jordanian rule.

The Jordanian census of 1961 found 167 inhabitants.

Post-1967
Since the Six-Day War in 1967,  Burham  has been under Israeli occupation.

After  the 1995 accords, 98% of  village land is defined as  Area B land, while the remaining 2% is defined as Area C.

According to the Palestinian Central Bureau of Statistics, Burham had a population of 565 in mid-year 2006. In the 2007 census by the PCBS, there were 616 people living in the town.

See also
Naseer Aruri

References

Bibliography

External links
 Welcome to Burham
Survey of Western Palestine, Map 14:  IAA, Wikimedia commons 
Burham village (fact sheet),  Applied Research Institute–Jerusalem (ARIJ)
Burham village profile, ARIJ
Burham, aerial photo, ARIJ
Locality Development Priorities and Needs in Burham Village, ARIJ
 Untold stories: Said Arouri, IMEU

Villages in the West Bank